Africa Miranda, is an American actress, singer, producer, author and model of Cape Verdean descent. She is best known for many beauty culture-related television programs and social media programs such as "Facebook Watch" and "#TravelFly Solo Weekend".

Personal life
Africa Miranda was born in Boston, Massachusetts, United States. She later grew up in Montgomery, Alabama.

Career
In 2004, she made film debut with the short film All the Women I've Loved by playing the role "India Piahno". In 2012, she made the television debut with the serial The Game and played the role "Denise". In the same year, she acted in the feature film What to Expect When You're Expecting, where she made the role "Adina".
 
In early 2015, she used the live-streaming app "Periscope" to shared beauty tips on the "do’s and don’ts" of booking auditions. This program later received large fan following and she became a Finalist in Periscoper of the Year at the 8th Annual Shorty Awards. Then in November 2016, she launched her own skincare line "Beauty by African Miranda".

She joined with the Bravo TV’s reality television series The New Atlanta, which made her turning point in the career. After the show, she was named as the first ever Brand Ambassador for international hair care company called "Creme of Nature". She appeared as the model of Argan Oil from Morocco campaign. She is also the co-creator of the live concept show 'The Lipstick Junkies' and 'The Hairnista Chronicles'.

In 2018, Facebook contacted Miranda to create a weekly lifestyle show for "Facebook Watch". In 2019, she released the book Step Up, Step Out, And Shine. Meanwhile, she made collaborative work with Parlour Magazine for many beauty culture works. In June 2019, she worked as the co-host of "#TravelFly Solo Weekend" in Morocco for Parlour Magazine. Then in August 2019, she was invited as a featured guest for "WanderRoam" in Thailand.

Filmography

References

External links
 IMDb

Living people
American film actresses
Cape Verdean people
Year of birth missing (living people)
21st-century American women